The Qatar Open is an annual table tennis tournament in Doha, Qatar, run by the International Table Tennis Federation (ITTF). It is currently part of the ITTF World Tour.

History

The tournament was first held in 1994, and has featured on the ITTF World Tour's schedule every year since 2005, and previously from 1997–99 and 2001-03.

Ma Long of China holds the record for most men's singles tournament wins, with four, while Zhang Yining of China holds the record for most women's singles tournament wins, also with four.

In August 2016, it was announced by the ITTF that Doha has been chosen as one of six cities to host a "World Tour Platinum" event in 2017. These events will replace the Super Series as the top tier of the ITTF World Tour.

Champions

1994–2018

2019–present

See also
Asian Table Tennis Union

References

External links
International Table Tennis Federation
Qatar Table Tennis Association

ITTF World Tour
Table tennis competitions
Table tennis competitions in Qatar
Recurring sporting events established in 1994